Musicae Scientiae is a quarterly peer-reviewed academic journal covering the field of music psychology. The editor-in-chief is Jane Ginsborg (Royal Northern College of Music). It was established 1997 and is published by SAGE Publications on behalf of the European Society for the Cognitive Sciences of Music.

Abstracting and indexing 
The journal is abstracted and indexed in the Arts and Humanities Citation Index, Current Contents/Arts & Humanities, Current Contents/Social & Behavioral Sciences, and the Social Sciences Citation Index. According to the Journal Citation Reports, the journal has a 2018 impact factor of 1.25

References

External links 
 

Music journals
SAGE Publishing academic journals
English-language journals
Quarterly journals
Publications established in 1992
Music psychology
Psychology journals
Cognitive science journals
Academic journals associated with international learned and professional societies of Europe